Scott Dunbier is an American comic book editor, best known as the Special Projects Editor at IDW Publishing.

Career
Dunbier rose to prominence in the comic book industry as executive editor of the Wildstorm comic book line. After several years as a dealer in original comic book artwork during the 1980s and 1990s, Dunbier began with Wildstorm in 1995 as Special Projects Editor. Two years later, he was named Editor-in-Chief, a title which was changed to Group Editor when Wildstorm became a part of DC Comics.

Among the many projects Dunbier edited for Wildstorm were Alan Moore's America's Best Comics line ( including Promethea, Tom Strong, The League of Extraordinary Gentlemen & Top 10), Arrowsmith and Challengers of the Unknown.

At Wildstorm, he also created the Absolute line of hardcover reprints, beginning with Absolute Authority vol. 1 in 2002.

Dunbier joined IDW Publishing as Special Projects Editor on April 1, 2008.

He is responsible for creating IDW's award-winning Artist's Edition line of hardcover reprint books.

Notes

References

External links

Scott Dunbier's Blog

Heidi MacDonald's 2002 interview with Scott Dunbier

Living people
Place of birth missing (living people)
Year of birth missing (living people)